Dergachevka is a rural locality (a village) in Pervomaysky Selsoviet, Sterlitamaksky District, Bashkortostan, Russia. The population was 298 as of 2010. There are 4 streets.

Geography 
Dergachevka is located 44 km northwest of Sterlitamak (the district's administrative centre) by road. Sokolovka is the nearest rural locality.

References 

Rural localities in Sterlitamaksky District